Samantha Lang  is an Australian film director and screenwriter. Her production company is Handmaid Media.

Early life and education 
Samantha Lang was born in London, England, migrating to Australia with her family at the age of 14. She attended North Sydney Girls' High School, earning her HSC in 1985.

She grew up watching European films, and was very influenced by the film Hiroshima Mon Amour.

In 1986 she spent a year at Universite de Grenoble, at Grenoble in France, studying French literature 
and linguistics.

After beginning her university studies in 1987, in 1989 Lang was awarded a scholarship from Qantas to study at the Fachhochschule Wiesbaden in Germany for 10 months, where she focused on film and photography. She also attended FAMU, the Czech film school in Prague, which she said was a "life-changing experience" for her. The government had been overthrown, as Vaclev Havel was coming to power, and young people who had previously been barred from attending university because of their parents' political leanings had just entered film school. In 1990 she graduated with a Bachelor of Design (Hons) in Visual Communications from University of Technology Sydney.

Lang graduated, in directing, from the Australian Film Television and Radio School in 1995. 

She is fluent in French and German.

Career
Lang's graduate short film, Audacious (1995), earned her some recognition and won an award at the Sydney Film Festival. She directed an episode in Twisted Tales, a mystery drama TV series narrated by Bryan Brown, in 1996.

Early in her career, Lang worked for advertising firm Cherub Pictures, directing television commercials. In the 1990s she did some stills photography and made some short films.

Lang's first feature film The Well, an adaptation of the novel by Elizabeth Jolley written by Laura Jones, produced by Sandra Levy and starring Miranda Otto and Pamela Rabe, was selected for 30 film festivals, including Sundance Film Festival, and was entered into competition for the Palme d'Or in the 1997 Cannes Film Festival.

The Monkey's Mask, her second film, is an international co-production 2000 thriller. It stars Susie Porter, Abbie Cornish, and Kelly McGillis. Porter plays a lesbian private detective who falls in love with a suspect (McGillis) in the disappearance of a young woman. The film is based on the 1994 verse novel of the same name by Australian poet Dorothy Porter.

L'idole (2002) was a French-language film, which starred Leelee Sobieski and James Hong. It was screened at the Edinburgh Film Festival; World of Women (WOW) Film Festival in Sydney; Toronto International Film Festival and Montreal World Film Festival in Canada; and in France, the Locarno Film Festival, Bordeaux International Festival of Women in Cinema and the Antipodean Film Festival in Saint Tropez.

In 2017, Lang directed her first VR film, Prehistoric VR. that is installed at Australian Centre for Moving Image (ACMI)

Brown Lake (2021) is an artist moving image work of "eco-cinema", narrated by Mia Wasikowska, that has been exhibited at Asia Pacific Triennale (2002) at GOMA, ACMI (2021) and other galleries and screening events.

Lang has in development an adaptation of the stage comedy Kill The Messenger by Nakkiah Lui.

A six-part TV drama series, Night Games, based on the book by Anna Krien, is in development.

In April 2022, Screen Australia announced funding for Immersion, a science fiction drama TV series to be directed by Garth Davis (Lion), written by Matt Vesely (Aftertaste) and executive produced by Emile Sherman (The King's Speech) and  Lang.

Production companies
Lang's production company is called Handmaid Media.

Other roles and activities
Lang was Head of Directing at AFTRS from 2010 to 2016, where she has mentored, supervised and lectured postgraduate film students. She has also mentored emerging filmmakers through Screen NSW, the HIVE Fund at Adelaide Film Festival, and Screen Australia.

She was elected as President of the Australian Directors' Guild (ADG) in 2015, relinquishing the role in December 2021 after serving for 12 years on the board in total. Under her leadership, there was huge growth in the number and diversity of members, and during this time she was one of the founding members of Screen Australia's Gender Matters program. She was passionate about encouraging more diverse directors, wanting to "broaden and support directors across a greater breadth and depth, industrially, professionally and culturally".

 Lang submitted her thesis for a Doctor of Philosophy (Communications) in 'Posthuman Screen Poetics' at University of Technology Sydney.

Filmography
 God's Bones (1993)
 Audacious (1995)
 Out (1995)
 The Well (1997)
 The Monkey's Mask (2000)
 L'idole (2002)
 Carlotta (2014)
 The Killing Field (2014)

Awards
Lang's films have won many awards, including at the Australian Film Institute Awards and the Sydney Film Festival. Carlotta won three of the five AACTA Awards in the categories in which it was nominated.

See also
 List of female film and television directors
 List of LGBT-related films directed by women

References

External links

Living people
Australian women film directors
Australian film directors
Australian women screenwriters
People educated at North Sydney Girls High School
Year of birth missing (living people)